Pseudorhaphitoma alfredi is a small sea snail, a marine gastropod mollusk in the family Mangeliidae.

Description
The length of the shell varies between 5 mm and 7 mm.

(Original description) This South African species differs from Mangilia costata var. coarctata Sowerby, G.B. III, 1897in form. The aperture is shorter and broader. Also the six or seven ribs are more regularly continuous up the spire, and especially in the much stronger spiral striation. The striae are close-set, hair-like, continued on and between the costae, and are easily observable under a simple lens The colour is somewhat variable. Some specimens are white with a broad band round the middle of the body whorl. Others are light brownish, and with or without a darker peripheral zone.

However R.N. Kilburn considered the simple spiral threads and total lack of apertural denticles atypical for this genus and thought that this species should belong  in Mangelia (s.l.) in a small complex of temperate water South African species

Distribution
This marine genus occurs off Port Alfred, South Africa, and Mozambique.

References

 Kilburn, R.N. & Rippey, E. (1982) Sea Shells of Southern Africa. Macmillan South Africa, Johannesburg, xi + 249 pp. page(s): 117
 Steyn, D.G. & Lussi, M. (1998) Marine Shells of South Africa. An Illustrated Collector’s Guide to Beached Shells. Ekogilde Publishers, Hartebeespoort, South Africa, ii + 264 pp.

External links
 
 

alfredi
Gastropods described in 1904